Darius Rochebin, born Darius Khoshbin on 25 December 1966 in Geneva, is a Swiss journalist of Iranian origin. From 1998 to 2020, he presented the newscast of the national broadcaster Radio Télévision Suisse (RTS) as well as the RTS program Pardonnez-moi, which interviews Swiss and international personalities. In August 2020, he left RTS and joined the French channel LCI to carry out daily interviews.

Biography
Darius Noël Khoshbin is the son of Alishah Khoshbin (1917-1994), pharmacist born in Iran, and Irène Mailler (1940-2008), born in Switzerland. He francized his name to Rochebin at the age of twenty.

After studying French literature at the University of Geneva, he worked as a journalist for the Journal de Genève (1987), then for the magazine L'Illustré, before joining Television Suisse Romande in 1995. He presented his first television news, TJ-Nuit, in 1996, then the weekend edition in 1997.

From 1998, he was the star presenter of the French-speaking Swiss national newspaper at 7:30 p.m., received by 257 million households around the world thanks to its coverage on TV5 Monde. As of 2008, the man that the newspaper Le Matin nicknamed the "Pope of the TJ" is the sole host for the television news on RTS.

At the same time, he ran an interview program called Pardonnez-moi, where he receives a topical personality every Sunday. Vladimir Putin, François Hollande, Hassan Rohani, Kofi Annan, Albert of Monaco, Dilma Rousseff, Emmanuel Macron, Klaus Schwab, Sepp Blatter, Julian Assange, Edward Snowden and Roman Polanski, Manuel Valls, Aung San Suu Kyi, Mikhail Gorbachev, Laurent Fabius, Bernadette Chirac, Christine Lagarde, Serge Klarsfeld, Johnny Hallyday, Alain Delon, Gérard Depardieu, Monica Bellucci, Arnold Schwarzenegger, Jean d'Ormesson, and Sylvain Tesson.

In 2011, he was made knight of the French Order of Arts and Letters.

In August 2019, Rochebin began his retirement and handed off duties to junior colleagues.

In July 2020, he announced that he was leaving RTS on August 2 after 25 years of collaboration to join the TF1 group.

Since August 24, 2020, he has hosted a daily interview program, Monday to Thursday, Le 20.00 de Darius Rochebin on the LCI channel. At the end of October 2020, he was temporarily replaced by Elizabeth Martichoux following accusations of sexual harassment.

Sexual harassment allegations
In October 2020, the Swiss daily Le Temps published an investigation containing several testimonies from people claiming to have been sexually harassed, or to have been the subject of an unwanted report, by the journalist at the time of his employment at RTS. The newspaper also reported conversations with minors revolving around sexuality under the cover of false profiles on social networks. Darius Rochebin "firmly denies having engaged in criminally reprehensible acts" and filed a complaint against Le Temps for defamation in December 2020. La Liberté spoke of "Dariusgate". Five hundred and fifty RTS employees signed an open letter to their management in which they stressed their surprise that, in a message addressed to the newspaper's teams, the latter only mentions the case of Darius Rochebin, while two other men were also mentioned in the report.

References

Living people
20th-century Swiss journalists
21st-century Swiss journalists
Year of birth missing (living people)
Swiss television journalists